Royal Air Force Peterborough or more simply RAF Peterborough is a former Royal Air Force installation in Cambridgeshire located  northwest of Peterborough city centre and  southeast of Stamford, Lincolnshire, England.

History
The following units were here at some point:
 No. 1 Aircraft Storage Unit RAF
 No. 1 Pupil Pilots Pool RAF
 No. 7 Flying Training School RAF
 No. 7 (Pilots) Advancing Flying Unit RAF
 No. 7 Service Flying Training School RAF
 No. 17 Elementary Flying Training School RAF
 No. 25 (Polish) Elementary Flying Training School RAF

Current use

The site is currently used for industrial work, and HMP Peterborough prison.

See also
 List of former Royal Air Force stations

References

Royal Air Force stations in Northamptonshire
Military units and formations established in 1932
1932 establishments in England
Military units and formations disestablished in 1964
History of Peterborough
Buildings and structures in Peterborough
RAF